Philadelphia Slick is a live hip hop band, fronted by rapper Noesis, formed in 2005. El Smooth and Noesis handle production for the band, which also includes saxophonist Matt Schwartz, bassist Mike Polinsky, and Ishmael Quintero.

In 2007 Philadelphia Slick won Philadelphia City Paper's Reader's Choice award for Top Local Band.

As of 2013, Philadelphia Slick is signed to Stoupe the Enemy of Mankind's Badtape Music label.

History
In 2006, Philadelphia Slick played the Emergenza Festival with performances at The Fire, The Five Spot, and The North Star Bar. The finals were held at the Theater of the Living Arts, where Noesis was named “Best Vocalist”.

The group's first venture came out in late 2007, though Noesis himself has released five solo albums. In 2007 Philadelphia Slick took home first prize in the Philly Sound Clash, a competition sponsored by PhillyCarShare at World Café Live.
In 2007 the band was the winner of the Philadelphia City Paper's Reader's Choice award for Top Local Band.

In 2010, the group released The Everything's Game EP, recorded at Bobby Eli's Studio E, displaying a vast difference in sound quality between Everything's Game and their last album, Oil. Only six tracks and 20 minutes long, it's their most concise release.

In June 2012 the track Gun 'Em Down from 2007's Culture Industry was used in a scene in Episode 4 of Sky Atlantic's Hit & Miss.

The Way Things Work, a solo album from Noesis independently released on July 6, 2012. Noesis's flow on the first single released, "A Picture," has drawn comparisons to Mos Def and Nas The album contains twenty tracks and features in house production from Noesis and drummer Elliot Garland (El Smooth).  The Way Things Work won the Independent Music Award for best hip hop/rap album of the year in 2012-2013 and topped out at #4 on the CMJ urban radio charts.

In May 2012, it was announced that Philadelphia Slick would be performing on The Vans Warped Tour, in Uniondale, NY.

On November 5, 2013 it was announced that the band had formerly joined music label/production collective Badtape Music. Badtape was co-founded by Stoupe the Enemy of Mankind most known for his work with Jedi Mind Tricks and Philly Slick's own Noesis.

Discography

Affiliates
With Noesis, Stoupe, Ish Quintero:

With Noesis, El Smooth:

With Noesis:

References

External links
 Official Site
 Badtape Music page
 Philly Slick's "Everything's Game" on Phrequency.com
 Philadelphia Slick MySpace Page
 Philadelphia City Paper article
 Emergenza

Alternative hip hop groups
Hip hop groups from Philadelphia
Musical groups established in 2005
Underground hip hop groups